Bodmin was the name of a parliamentary constituency in Cornwall from 1295 until 1983. Initially, it was a parliamentary borough, which returned two Members of Parliament to the House of Commons of England and later the House of Commons of the Parliament of the United Kingdom until the 1868 general election, when its representation was reduced to one member.

The old borough was abolished with effect from the 1885 general election, but the name was transferred to a county constituency, which elected a single member until the constituency was abolished with effect from the 1983 general election, when the area it then covered was divided between the existing North Cornwall and the new Cornwall South East.

Boundaries
1885–1918: The Boroughs of Bodmin and Liskeard, the Sessional Division of East, South, and West Hundred, part of the Sessional Division of Powder Tywardreath, and the parishes of Bodmin, Helland, and Lanivet.

1918–1950: The Boroughs of Bodmin, Fowey, Liskeard, Lostwithiel, and Saltash, the Urban Districts of Callington, Looe, and Torpoint, the Rural Districts of Liskeard and St Germans, in the Rural District of St Austell the parishes of St Sampson and Tywardreath, and part of the Rural District of Bodmin.

1950–1974: The Boroughs of Bodmin, Fowey, Liskeard, Lostwithiel, and Saltash, the Urban Districts of Looe and Torpoint, the Rural Districts of Liskeard and St Germans, in the Rural District of St Austell the parishes of Lanlivery, Luxulyan, and St Sampson, and in the Rural District of Wadebridge the parishes of Blisland, Cardinham, Helland, Lanhydrock, Lanivet, and Withiel.

1974–1983: The Boroughs of Bodmin, Liskeard, and Saltash, the Urban Districts of Looe and Torpoint, the Rural Districts of Liskeard and St Germans, the Rural Borough of Lostwithiel, in the Rural District of St Austell the parishes of Lanlivery, Luxulyan, and St Sampson, and in the Rural District of Wadebridge and Padstow the parishes of Blisland, Cardinham, Helland, Lanhydrock, Lanivet, and Withiel.

History

Borough constituency (1295–1885)
The borough which was represented from the time of the Model Parliament consisted of the town of Bodmin though not the whole of the parish. Unlike many of the boroughs in Cornwall which were represented in the Unreformed House of Commons, Bodmin was a town of reasonable size and retained some importance; for most purposes, indeed, it was considered the county town of Cornwall. In 1831, the population of the borough was 3,375, and contained 596 houses.

The right to vote, however, was held not by the residents at large but by the town's corporation, consisting of a Mayor, 11 aldermen and 24 common councilmen. Contested elections were quite unknown before the Reform Act, the choice of the two MPs being left entirely to the "patron". However, this power did not arise, as in many rotten boroughs, from the patron being able to coerce the voters; in Bodmin, the patron was expected to meet the public and private expenses of the corporation and its members in return for their acquiescence at election time.

Early in the 18th century, the Robartes family (Earls of Radnor) were the accepted patrons. Their interest was inherited by George Hunt, whose mother was the Robartes heiress, but he ran into difficulties and could not afford to retain complete control. By the 1760s another local magnate, Sir William Irby, secured enough of the town's goodwill to have a say in the choice of one member, while Hunt continued to select the other. In 1816, the patron was Lord de Dunstanville, nominating both MPs, but he found himself so overburdened with debts that he was forced to give it up, and The Marquess of Hertford was induced to take over the patronage, and the corporation's debts.

While the MP was not expected to assume the same financial obligations as the patron, nor to attend to the needs of his constituents in the manner of a modern MP, they were expected to attend the election ball, a high point in the social calendar for the wives and daughters of the otherwise undistinguished corporation members. John Wilson Croker, elected in 1820, described the Bodmin ball as "tumultuous and merry " but "at once tiresome and foolish".

Bodmin retained both its MPs under the Reform Act, but its boundaries were extended to bring in more of Bodmin parish and the whole of the neighbouring parishes of Lanivet, Lanhydrock and Helland. This increased the population to 5,258, although only 252 were qualified to vote.

By the time of the second Reform Act in 1867, Bodmin's electorate was still below 400, and consequently its representation was halved with effect from the 1868 general election. The extension of the franchise more than doubled the electorate, but Bodmin was still far too small to survive as a borough, and was abolished in 1885.

County constituency (1885–1983)

The Bodmin constituency from 1885 until 1918, strictly called the South-Eastern or Bodmin Division of Cornwall, covered the whole of the south-east corner of the county, including as well as Bodmin itself the towns of Liskeard, Fowey, Lostwithiel and Saltash. Although predominantly rural, the string of small ports along its coast gave it a maritime as well as agricultural character. Through most of this period the constituency was marginal, the Unionists being helped by the popularity of their candidate Leonard Courtney, who had been Liberal MP for Liskeard when it was still a separate borough before joining the Liberal Unionists when the party split in 1886. Looe and the other fishing ports were predominantly Liberal and Fowey a Unionist stronghold, while the areas within the ambit of Plymouth's dockyards tended to vote against whichever was the sitting government. Another factor was the strength of non-conformist religion, as elsewhere in Cornwall, and this was thought to be the explanation for the Liberal gain in 1906, when agricultural seats elsewhere mostly remained with the Tories.

The boundary changes at the 1918 general election, which established what was now called Cornwall, Bodmin Division, and later Bodmin County Constituency, extended the constituency somewhat towards the centre of the county, taking in Callington and the surrounding district. These boundaries remained essentially unchanged for the remainder of the constituency's existence, except that Fowey was moved into the Truro constituency in 1974. As elsewhere in Cornwall, Labour never established a foothold in Bodmin, and the Liberals remained the main challengers to the Conservatives. The Conservatives held it continuously from 1945 to 1964, and at one point might have considered it a safe seat, but by the mid-1960s the Liberal revival had established it as a Liberal-Conservative marginal, which it remained until its abolition.

The Bodmin constituency ceased to exist as a result of the boundary changes implemented in 1983. Although the bulk of the constituency survived, Bodmin itself had been moved, enforcing a change of name: Bodmin joined North Cornwall, while the rest of the constituency was reunited with Fowey to become South East Cornwall. Bodmin's last Member, Robert Hicks, stood and was elected for the latter constituency.

Members of Parliament

MPs 1295–1640

Back to Members of Parliament

MPs 1640–1868

Back to Members of Parliament

MPs 1868–1983

Back to Members of Parliament

Elections

Elections in the 1830s

Elections in the 1840s

 
 

Vivian succeeded to the peerage, becoming 2nd Baron Vivian and causing a by-election.

 

 

 
 

Back to elections

Elections in the 1850s

 

 

 

 
 

 

  

 

 

 

Michell resigned by accepting the office of Steward of the Manor of Northstead, causing a by-election.

Back to elections

Elections in the 1860s

 

The seat was reduced to one member for the 1868 election.

 

Back to elections

Elections in the 1870s

Back to elections

Elections in the 1880s 

Back to elections

Elections in the 1890s 

Back to elections

Elections in the 1900s 

Back to elections

Elections in the 1910s 

General election 1914–15:

Another general election was required to take place before the end of 1915. The political parties had been making preparations for an election to take place and by the July 1914, the following candidates had been selected; 
Unionist: Charles Hanson
Liberal: Isaac Foot

Back to elections

Elections in the 1920s 

Back to elections

Elections in the 1930s 

General election 1939–40:
Another general election was required to take place before the end of 1940. The political parties had been making preparations for an election to take place from 1939 and by the end of this year, the following candidates had been selected; 
Conservative: John Rathbone
Liberal: John Foot
Labour: R. H. Baker (withdrew)
Back to elections

Elections in the 1940s 

Back to elections

Elections in the 1950s 

Back to elections

Elections in the 1960s 

Back to elections

Elections in the 1970s 

Back to elections

Notes

References

Sources
  The History of Parliament Trust, Bodmin, Borough from 1386 to 1868
 
 D. Brunton & D. H. Pennington, Members of the Long Parliament (London: George Allen & Unwin, 1954)
 Cobbett's Parliamentary History of England, from the Norman Conquest in 1066 to the year 1803 (London: Thomas Hansard, 1808) 
 F. W. S. Craig, British Parliamentary Election Results 1832-1885 (2nd edition, Aldershot: Parliamentary Research Services, 1989)
Craig, F. W. S. (1974-06-18). British Parliamentary Election Results 1885–1918. Springer. 
 Michael Kinnear, The British Voter (London: B. H. Batsford, Ltd, 1968)
 Henry Pelling, Social Geography of British Elections 1885-1910 (London: Macmillan, 1967)
 J. Holladay Philbin, Parliamentary Representation 1832 - England and Wales (New Haven: Yale University Press, 1965)
 Edward Porritt and Annie G. Porritt, The Unreformed House of Commons (Cambridge University Press, 1903)
  
 Frederic A. Youngs Jr, "Guide to the Local Administrative Units of England, Vol I" (London: Royal Historical Society, 1979)

Constituencies of the Parliament of the United Kingdom established in 1295
Constituencies of the Parliament of the United Kingdom disestablished in 1983
Parliamentary constituencies in Cornwall (historic)
Bodmin